James Hog (1658?–14 May 1734) was a Scottish Presbyterian minister at Carnock, known for his role in the Marrow Controversy within the Church of Scotland.

Life
He was the son of Thomas Hog, minister of Larbert, Stirlingshire (d. 1680?). After graduating with an MA from the University of Edinburgh in 1677. He studied theology in Holland, was licensed to preach by the presbytery of Edinburgh, and ordained minister of Dalserf parish, in the presbytery of Hamilton, 20 January 1691.

Hog declined on principle to take the oath of allegiance in 1693. Against his own desire he was in 1695 elected a member of the General Assembly of the Church of Scotland, but declined to take the required oaths. The Lord High Commissioner then objected to his taking his seat, and Hog under pressure retired from the Assembly.

In bad health Hog resigned his charge on 12 November 1696, but in August 1699 he was installed in the parish of Carnock, Fife, and held the post till his death, on 14 May 1734. 

Hog had arranged for the memoirs of the Covenanter Katherine Ross to be published and this work appeared in 1735.

The Marrow Men
Hog belonged to the stricter section of the Church of Scotland, who cherished the Covenanter traditions, upheld popular rights, and took their stand against the more tolerant methods of thought and discipline that had come into the church. He originated the "Marrow" controversy by the republication in 1718, with a preface, of the Marrow of Modern Divinity. The book was denounced by an act of the assembly in 1720, whereupon Hog and 11 other ministers, who became known as the "Marrow Men", presented a protest. The bitter controversy which followed was an indirect cause of the First Secession of 1733. He was eulogised by Ralph Erskine.

Works
Besides prefaces to other religious treatises, Hog was the author of a large number of theological pamphlets.
Remarks  concerning  the  Spirit's Operation,  and  the  difference  betwixt  the Law  and  the  Gospel  (Edinburgh,  1701) — issued  also  as  Notes  about  the  Spirit's Operations  for  discovering  from  the  Word their   Nature    and    Evidence (Edinburgh, 1709)
A  Letter  to a  Friend,  containing  diverse  Remarks concerning  the  Sacrament  of  the  Lord's Supper  (Edinburgh,  1706)
The  Covenants  of Redemption  and  Grace  displayed  (Edinburgh, 1707)
Otia  Christiana,  or Christian  Recreations  (Edinburgh,  1708 ; Aberdeen,  1776)  [in  the  First  Edition the  author's  signature  appears  in  error  at the  end  of  the  Preface  as  "  John  Hog "]
Some  Remarks  about  Submission  to  the Sovereign  disposure  of  the  God  of  the Spirits  of  all  Flesh  (Edinburgh, 1709)
Notes  about  Saving  Illumination  (n.d., also  reprinted  at  Aberdeen,  1778)
A  Letter to  a  Person  exercised  to  Godliness  about  our Natural  Enmity  (Edinburgh,  1714)
An Abstract  of  Sundry  Discourses  on  Job XXXV I.,  8,  9,  10  (Edinburgh,  1714; Aberdeen,  1778)
Abstract  of  two  private Discourses  on  Mark  LX.,  23  (Edinburgh, 1715)
Remarks  concerning  the  Rooting, Growth,  and  Ripeness  of  a  Work  of  Grace in  the  Soul  (Edinburgh,  1715)
An  Essay to  vindicate  some  Scripture  Truths  [against Professor  Simson]  (Edinburgh,  1716)
A Letter  to  a  Gentleman  detecting  the  gangrene of  some  Errors  vented  at  this  Time  (Edinburgh, 1716)
Abstract  of  Discourses  on Psalm  XLI.,  4  (Edinburgh,  1716)
Letter to  a  private  Christian  on  Gospel  Holiness (Edinburgh,  n.d.)
Three  Missives  written to  a  Minister  of  the  Gospel,  in  answer  to one  from  him  [an  anti-Separatist  tract (Edinburgh,  1717,  the  first  of  those  missives was  reprinted  at  Edinburgh  in  1893)
The Right  of  Church  Members  to  choose  their own  Overseers  (Edinburgh,  1717)
The Marrow  of  Modern  Divinity  [by  Edward Fisher],  edited  with  Preface  (Edinburgh, 1718)
A  Vindication  of  the  Doctrine  of Grace  from  the  Charge  of  Antinomianism (Edinburgh,  1718)
Some  Proposals  for Peace  and  Harmony  (Edinburgh,  1718)
Some  Missives  addressed  to  a  Gentleman which  contain  the  Author's  aim  at  detecting and  refuting  the  Decision .  . of  our  Time [twelve  letters]  (Edinburgh,  1718)
A  Letter concerning  the  True  State  of  the  Question between  the  Non-Jurant  and  Jurant Ministers  of  the  Church  of  Scotland (Edinburgh,  1718)
An  Explication  of Passages  excepted  against  in  the  Marrow of  Modern  Divinity  (Edinburgh,  1719)
A  Conference  between  Epaphroditus  and Epaphras  (Edinburgh,  1719)
Remarks upon  the  Review  of  A  Conference,  etc. (Edinburgh,  1719)
Letter  to  a  Gentleman, containing  a  detection  of  Errors  in  a  Print entitled  "The  Snake  in  the  Grass"  (Edinburgh, 1720)  [in  Answer  to  "The  Snake  in the  Grass,"  or  Remarks  upon  The  Marrow of  Modern  Divinity (Edinburgh,  1719)]
The  Scope  and  Substance  of  the  Marrow of  Modern  Divinity  (Edinburgh,  1721)
Reasons  of  Masters  James  Hog  and  James Bathgate  .  .  .  for  their  not  Observing  the Day  of  Thanksgiving  (n.p.,  1724)
Answer to  Campbell's  Discourse  proving  that  the Apostles  were  no  Enthusiasts  (Edinburgh)
On  Covenanting  (Edinburgh,  1727)
The  Controversie  concerning  the  Marrow .  .  . Considered  in  Several  Familiar Dialogues,  I.,  II. (Edinburgh,  1721-2)
Queries  agreed  unto  by  the  Commission  of the  General  Assembly  (1721)  and  put  to those  Ministers  .  .  .  together  with  the Answers  given  (n.p.,  1722)
Memoirs  of the  Public  Life  of  Mr  James  Hog  and of  the  Ecclesiastical  Proceedings  of  his Time  previous  to  his  Settlement  at  Carnock, written  by  himself  as  a  Testamentary Memorial  (1798).

Family
He married,  and  had  issue — 
Alison  (married  William Hunter,  minister  of  Lilliesleaf)
Janet  (married Daniel  Hunter,  minister  of  Carnock).

Bibliography
Reg.  Bur.  (Edin.)
Boston's  Mem.
Wodrow's  Corresp.,  i.  23-6, 105-8,  ii.  3,  191,  508,  iii.  7
Edin.  Chris. Inst.,  1831-2,  p.  694
Brown's  Gospel Truth
Fraser's  Ralph  Erskine
Fraser's The  Christian,  the  Student,  and  Pastor, Exemplified  (Edinburgh,  1781)
Erskine's Fife  Bibliog.,  171-4
Henderson's  Religious Controversies  of  Scotland,  20-43;

Citations

Sources

Attribution

Further reading

1658 births
1734 deaths
17th-century Ministers of the Church of Scotland
Alumni of the University of Edinburgh
People from Fife
Scottish evangelicals
18th-century Ministers of the Church of Scotland